In India states earn revenue through own taxes, central taxes, non-taxes and central grants. For most states, own taxes form the largest part of the total state revenue. Taxes as per the state list includes land revenue, taxes on agricultural income, electricity duty, luxury tax, entertainment tax and stamp duty.

Data 
The following list has been compiled from Reserve Bank of India's "Handbook of Statistics on Indian States".

(in ₹ crores)

Notes

State Government revenue and spending

Article 246 of the Indian Constitution, distributes legislative powers including taxation, between the Parliament of India and the State Legislature.

The constitution does not have provision for the central government and the States to have concurrent power of taxation. The tables below lists the thirteen taxes to be levied by the Central government and  nineteen taxes by States including Gujarat.

Central government of India

State governments

Goods and Services Tax 
The tax came into effect from 1 July 2017 through the implementation of the One Hundred and First Amendment of the Constitution of India by the Indian government. The GST replaced existing multiple taxes levied by the central and state governments.
It an indirect tax (or consumption tax) used on the supply of goods and services. It is a comprehensive, multistage, destination-based tax: comprehensive because it has subsumed almost all the indirect taxes except a few state taxes. Multi-staged as it is, the GST is imposed at every step in the production process, but is meant to be refunded to all parties in the various stages of production other than the final consumer and as a destination-based tax, it is collected from point of consumption and not point of origin like previous taxes.

See also
 Taxation in India
GSP of Indian states
 Demographics of India
 List of most populous cities in India
 List of most populous metropolitan areas in India

State taxation in India
Economy of India lists
Lists of subdivisions of India

References

Further reading